The first world record in the women's pole vault was recognised by the International Association of Athletics Federations in 1994. The inaugural record, 4.05 metres by Sun Caiyun of China set in 1992, was the world's best mark as of December 31, 1994.

As of June 21, 2009, the IAAF has ratified 54 world records in the event.

Pre-IAAF Record Progression

The first mark shows the measurement system in use at the time of the jump, the second mark shows the conversion. Marks set in the USA during this era were always measured in imperial measurements. Most of the world and IAAF recognize marks in metric measurements.

IAAF Record Progression

See also
 Men's pole vault world record progression

Notes

Pole vault, women
Pole vault, women
World record women
world record